Vilkija (or Vilki) is a city in the Kaunas district municipality, Lithuania.

Etymology 
The name of Vilkija originated when people living on the opposite side of Nemunas heard the packs of wolves howling in the surroundings of 
the place where contemporary Vilkija is situated. From then on, this land is called Vilkija and this name may have been derived from words vilkų gauja meaning a pack of wolves.

History

During summer and fall 1941, mass executions of 800 Jews were perpetrated by an Einsatzgruppen of Germans and Lithuanian nationalists. Murdered Jews were from Vilkija and nearby villages.

Notable people 

 Folklorist Antanas Juška (1819–1880) lived in Vilkija 1862–1864.
 In the end of 1863 one of the revolt leaders Antanas Mackevičius (1828–1863) was captured close to Vilkija and later taken to Kaunas to be executed.
 Writer Petras Cvirka (1909–1947) studied in Vilkija 1922–1926.

References

Cities in Kaunas County
Cities in Lithuania
Duchy of Samogitia
Kovensky Uyezd
Holocaust locations in Lithuania